Thankful Baptist Church may refer to:

Thankful Baptist Church (Rome, Georgia), listed on the National Register of Historic Places in Floyd County, Georgia
Thankful Baptist Church (Johnson City, Tennessee), listed on the National Register of Historic Places in Washington County, Tennessee